Lomnica (Serbian Cyrillic: Ломница) is a village in Central Serbia (Šumadija), in the municipality of Rekovac (Region of Levač), lying at , at the elevation of 250 m. According to the 2002 census, the village had 169 citizens.

External links
 Levac Online
 Article about Lomnica
 Pictures from Lomnica

Populated places in Pomoravlje District
Šumadija